St. Paul is a city in Marion County, Oregon,  United States. It is named after the Saint Paul Mission founded by Archbishop François Norbert Blanchet, who arrived in the Oregon Country in 1838 to minister to the Catholic inhabitants of French Prairie. The population was 434 at the 2020 census. The city is part of the Salem Metropolitan Statistical Area.

History 

French Prairie settlers built a log church near this locale in 1836. On January 6, 1839, Father (later Archbishop) Blanchet celebrated the first Catholic mass in Oregon at St. Paul, when he blessed the log church and dedicated it to St. Paul.

St. Paul Roman Catholic Church was built in 1846 and is the oldest brick building in the Pacific Northwest.

St. Paul post office was established in 1874. The city was incorporated in 1901.

Pioneer cemetery
St. Paul Pioneer Cemetery, founded in 1839, is the burial location for William Cannon, the only authenticated Revolutionary War veteran buried in Oregon. He had arrived in Oregon in 1811 as part of John Jacob Astor's American Fur Company. His is the only grave marked with an upright headstone in the cemetery. Only one other grave is marked; the rest of the grave markers were mistakenly bulldozed in the 1930s.

Along with Cannon, 535 other early settlers and Native Americans are buried in the pioneer cemetery, including Étienne Lucier, known as "The Father of Oregon Agriculture", and François Rivet and Philippe Degre who claimed to be members of the Lewis and Clark Expedition. Rivet had accompanied the expedition as far as Fort Mandan, and Degre attached himself in to the company while they wintered there in 1804–1805.

A wall of remembrance in the cemetery was dedicated in 2005, with members of the Confederated Tribes of the Grand Ronde Community of Oregon as honored guests. Early French Canadian settlers often married women from the local tribes, which included the Clackamas, Molala and Kalapuya.

Archbishop Blanchet was originally buried in the pioneer cemetery, but his remains were later moved to St. Paul Catholic Cemetery a few blocks away. The new cemetery was founded in 1875 and includes a "Nuns Corner", where several sisters who had originally been buried in a corner of the convent garden were reinterred. Early settler and provisional legislator William J. Bailey is also buried at the new cemetery.

Geography

The city is near Mission Creek, a tributary of Champoeg Creek, which flows into the Willamette River.

Demographics

2010 census
As of the census of 2010, there were 421 people, 147 households, and 113 families residing in the city. The racial makeup of the city was 94.1% White, 0.5% Native American, 4.8% from other races, and 0.7% from two or more races. Hispanic or Latino of any race were 14.7% of the population.

There were 147 households, of which 43.5% had children under the age of 18 living with them, 66.0% were married couples living together, 6.1% had a female householder with no husband present, 4.8% had a male householder with no wife present, and 23.1% were non-families. 20.4% of all households were made up of individuals, and 9.5% had someone living alone who was 65 years of age or older. The average household size was 2.86 and the average family size was 3.28.

The median age in the city was 38 years. 30.9% of residents were under the age of 18; 4.9% were between the ages of 18 and 24; 26.5% were from 25 to 44; 25.7% were from 45 to 64; and 12.4% were 65 years of age or older. The gender makeup of the city was 49.2% male and 50.8% female.

2000 census
As of the census of 2000, there were 354 people, 123 households, and 90 families residing in the city. The population density was 1,231.4 people per square mile (471.3/km). There were 128 housing units at an average density of 445.2 per square mile (170.4/km). The racial makeup of the city was 78.25% White, 0.28% African American, 0.56% Native American, 0.28% Asian, 18.08% from other races, and 2.54% from two or more races. Hispanic or Latino of any race were 25.71% of the population.

There were 123 households, out of which 34.1% had children under the age of 18 living with them, 54.5% were married couples living together, 8.9% had a female householder with no husband present, and 26.8% were non-families. 19.5% of all households were made up of individuals, and 10.6% had someone living alone who was 65 years of age or older. The average household size was 2.88 and the average family size was 3.34.

In the city, the population was spread out, with 30.5% under the age of 18, 7.9% from 18 to 24, 25.4% from 25 to 44, 22.0% from 45 to 64, and 14.1% who were 65 years of age or older. The median age was 33 years. For every 100 females, there were 110.7 males. For every 100 females age 18 and over, there were 106.7 males.

The median income for a household in the city was $43,750, and the median income for a family was $55,000. Males had a median income of $39,583 versus $25,357 for females. The per capita income for the city was $19,144. About 3.8% of families and 11.3% of the population were below the poverty line, including 8.0% of those under age 18 and none of those age 65 or over.

Arts and culture

Annual cultural events
The St. Paul Rodeo has been held every 4th of July since 1935. It is one of the 20 largest rodeos in the U.S. and was voted by the Professional Rodeo Cowboys Association as the finest rodeo in the Pacific Northwest in 1991.

Also, every summer, the Professional Bull Riders holds a minor-league, Touring Pro Division (TPD) event in St. Paul.

Museums and other points of interest
The center of St. Paul was listed on the National Register of Historic Places (NRHP) in 1982 as the St. Paul Historic District. The district includes 63 contributing properties, with St. Paul Catholic Church, which is also individually listed on the NRHP, as the centerpiece.

Education

Public education in St. Paul is provided by the two-school St. Paul School District. St. Paul Elementary School serves grades Pre-K through 6, and St. Paul Middle & High School serves grades 7 through 12. St. Paul Parochial School, a private Pre-K through eighth grade parish school, was founded in 1844 by six Sisters of Notre Dame de Namur as Sainte Marie de Willamette. The sisters ran the school until 1853. In 1861, the Sisters of the Holy Names of Jesus and Mary took over the school and ran it through the 1980s. From 1993 through 2000, the school was served by the Sisters of St. Mary of Oregon.

Transportation
Oregon Route 219 passes through St. Paul.

Notable people
Herman Pillette (1895–1960), baseball player

References

External links

 Entry for St. Paul in the Oregon Blue Book
Historic images of St. Paul from Salem Public Library Historic Photograph Collections
 Images of St. Paul from University of Oregon Libraries Digital Collections
https://www.stpauloregon.org

Cities in Oregon
Cities in Marion County, Oregon
Salem, Oregon metropolitan area
Populated places established in 1839
1839 establishments in Oregon Country